Milan Studnička (born 19 October 1977) is a Czech bobsledder. He competed in the four man event at the 2002 Winter Olympics.

References

1977 births
Living people
Czech male bobsledders
Olympic bobsledders of the Czech Republic
Bobsledders at the 2002 Winter Olympics
Sportspeople from Most (city)